Richard Edgar Quine (born Richard Edgar Quine on 16 August 1934) is a Manx politician.  After serving in the Hong Kong Police Force, he was elected to the House of Keys in 1986, where he represented Ayre until 2004.

Edgar Quine was the leader of the Manx political party, the Alliance for Progressive Government and served as deputy Speaker of the House of Keys between 2002 and 2004.

He also serves as President of Ayre United F.C.

He married his wife Ann in Hong Kong on 15 July 1959. The couple celebrated their 50th wedding anniversary in 2009.

Ministerial positions
Minister of Local Government and the Environment, 1996-1999

Speeches
On democracy in relation to the Isle of Man (October 2005):
http://www.positiveactiongroup.org/Edgar_Quine_Peel_Cathedral_lecture.pdf

References

1934 births
Living people
Members of the House of Keys 1986–1991
Members of the House of Keys 1991–1996
Members of the House of Keys 1996–2001
Members of the House of Keys 2001–2006
Manx football chairmen and investors
20th-century Manx politicians
21st-century Manx politicians